The 2002 NCAA Division I-A football season ended with a double overtime national championship game.  Ohio State and Miami both came into the Fiesta Bowl undefeated.  The underdog Buckeyes defeated the defending-champion Hurricanes 31–24, ending Miami's 34-game winning streak. Jim Tressel won the national championship in only his second year as head coach.

Rose Bowl officials were vocally upset over the loss of the Big Ten champ from the game.  Former New England Patriots coach Pete Carroll returned the USC Trojans to a BCS bid in only his second season as head coach. Notre Dame also returned to prominence, as Tyrone Willingham became the first coach in Notre Dame history to win 10 games in his first season.

Beginning with the 2002 season, teams were allowed to schedule twelve regular season games instead of eleven leading to additional revenues for all teams and allowing players the enhanced opportunity to break various statistical records.

Rules changes
The NCAA Rules Committee adopted the following rules changes for the 2002 season:
 The penalty for violating the so-called "Halo Rule" (two yard restricted area around the punt/kick receiver) without making contact with the receiver is increased from five yards to 10 yards.  
 Flagrant personal fouls committed during possession by the defense in overtime will be carried over to the next extra period.  Previously, those fouls were disregarded but the player committing the foul was ejected from the game.
 All players are required to wear facemasks of the same color.
 Penalties committed during a touchdown play can now either be enforced on the PAT or the ensuing kickoff.

Conference and program changes
No teams upgraded from Division I-AA, leaving the number of Division I-A schools fixed at 117.
The only conference move during this season saw the University of Central Florida leave the Independent ranks to join the Mid-American Conference as its 14th member.

Regular season top 10 matchups
Rankings reflect the AP Poll. Rankings for Week 9 and beyond will list BCS Rankings first and AP Poll second. Teams that failed to be a top 10 team for one poll or the other will be noted.
Week 2
No. 1 Miami defeated No. 6 Florida, 41–16 (Ben Hill Griffin Stadium, Gainesville, Florida)
Week 3
No. 6 Ohio State defeated No. 10 Washington State, 25–7 (Ohio Stadium, Columbus, Ohio)
Week 4
No. 10 Florida defeated No. 4 Tennessee, 30–13 (Neyland Stadium, Knoxville, Tennessee)
Week 7
No. 1 Miami defeated No. 9 Florida State, 28–27 (Miami Orange Bowl, Miami, Florida)
No. 2 Oklahoma defeated No. 3 Texas, 35–24 (Cotton Bowl, Dallas, Texas)
No. 6 Georgia defeated No. 10 Tennessee, 18–13 (Sanford Stadium, Athens, Georgia)
Week 8
No. 2 Oklahoma defeated No. 9 Iowa State, 49–3 (Oklahoma Memorial Stadium, Norman, Oklahoma)
Week 13
No. 2/2 Ohio State defeated No. 9/12 Michigan, 14–9 (Ohio Stadium, Columbus, Ohio)
Week 14
No. 6/6 USC defeated No. 7/7 Notre Dame, 44–13 (Los Angeles Memorial Coliseum, Los Angeles, California)

Conference standings

Bowl Championship Series rankings

Final BCS rankings

Bowl games

The Rose Bowl normally features the champions of the Big Ten and the Pac-10. However, Big Ten-champion Ohio State, finishing No. 2 in the BCS, had qualified to play in the 2003 Fiesta Bowl for the national championship against Miami (Florida)  Earlier in the season, Ohio State had defeated Washington State 25–7.

After the national championship was set, the Orange Bowl had the next pick, and invited No. 3 (No. 5 BCS) Iowa from the Big Ten.  When it was the Rose Bowl's turn to select, the best available team was No. 8 (No. 7 BCS) Oklahoma, who won the Big 12 Championship Game. When it came time for the Orange Bowl and Sugar Bowl to make a second pick, both wanted Pac-10 co-champion USC. However, a BCS rule stated that if two bowls wanted the same team, the bowl with the higher payoff had priority. The Orange Bowl immediately extended an at-large bid to the No. 5 Trojans and paired them with at-large No. 3 Iowa in a Big Ten/Pac-10 "Rose Bowl East" matchup in the 2003 Orange Bowl. The Rose Bowl was left to pair Oklahoma with Pac-10 co-champion Washington State. Rose Bowl committee executive director Mitch Dorger was not pleased with the results.

As such, the BCS instituted a new rule, whereby a bowl losing its conference champion to the BCS championship could "protect" the second-place team from that conference from going to another bowl.  This left the Sugar Bowl with No. 14 BCS Florida State, the winner of the Atlantic Coast Conference. Notre Dame at 10–2 and No. 9 in the BCS standings was invited to the 2003 Gator Bowl. Kansas State at No. 8 also was left out.

BCS bowls
Fiesta Bowl: No. 2 Ohio State (BCS No. 2 Big Ten Champ) 31, No. 1 Miami (BCS No. 1 Big East Champ) 24 (2 OT)
Sugar Bowl: No. 4 Georgia (BCS No. 3 SEC Champ) 26, No. 16 Florida State (BCS No. 14 ACC Champ) 13
Orange Bowl: No. 5 USC (BCS No. 4) 38, No. 3 Iowa (BCS No. 5 At-Large) 17
Rose Bowl: No. 8 Oklahoma (BCS No. 7 Big 12 Champ) 34, No. 7 Washington State (BCS No. 6 Pac-10 Champ) 14

Other New Year's Day bowls
Cotton Bowl Classic: No. 9 Texas 35, LSU 20
Capital One Bowl: No. 19 Auburn 13, No. 10 Penn State 9
Gator Bowl: No. 17 NC State 28, No. 11 Notre Dame 6
Outback Bowl: No. 12 Michigan 38, No. 22 Florida 30

December Bowl Games
Holiday Bowl: No. 6 Kansas State 34, Arizona State 27
Peach Bowl: No. 20 Maryland 30, Tennessee 3
Tangerine Bowl: Texas Tech 55, Clemson 15
Sun Bowl: Purdue 34, Washington 24
Independence Bowl: Mississippi 27, Nebraska 23
Alamo Bowl: Wisconsin 31, No. 14 Colorado 28
Insight Bowl: No. 24 Pittsburgh 38, Oregon State 13
Liberty Bowl: TCU (C-USA Champ) 25, No. 23 Colorado State (MWC Champ) 3
Humanitarian Bowl: No. 18 Boise State (WAC Champ) 34, Iowa State 16
Motor City Bowl: Boston College 51, Toledo 25
Hawai'i Bowl: Tulane 36, Hawai'i 28
Seattle Bowl: Wake Forest 38, Oregon 17
San Francisco Bowl: No. 21 Virginia Tech 20, Air Force 13
Music City Bowl: Minnesota 29, No. 25 Arkansas 14
Las Vegas Bowl: UCLA 27, New Mexico 13
GMAC Bowl: Marshall (MAC Champ) 38, Louisville 15
Silicon Valley Classic: Fresno State 30, Georgia Tech 21
Houston Bowl: Oklahoma State 33, Southern Miss 23
Continental Tire Bowl: Virginia 48, No. 15 West Virginia 22
New Orleans Bowl: North Texas (Sun Belt Champ) 24, Cincinnati 19

Heisman Trophy voting
The Heisman Memorial Trophy Award is given to the Most Outstanding Player of the year
Winner:
Carson Palmer (Sr.), QB, USC (1,328 points)
2. Brad Banks (Sr.), QB, Iowa (1,095 points)
3. Larry Johnson (Sr.), RB, Penn State (726 points)
4. Willis McGahee (So.), RB, Miami (660 points)
5. Ken Dorsey (Sr.), QB, Miami (643 points)

Other major awards
Maxwell Award (College player of the Year): Larry Johnson, Penn State
Walter Camp Award (top back): Larry Johnson, Penn State
Associated Press Player of the Year: Brad Banks, Iowa
Davey O'Brien Award (quarterback): Brad Banks, Iowa
Johnny Unitas Award (Sr. quarterback): Carson Palmer, USC
Doak Walker Award (running back): Larry Johnson, Penn State
Fred Biletnikoff Award (wide receiver): Charles Rogers, Michigan State
John Mackey Award (tight end): Dallas Clark, Iowa
Dave Rimington Trophy (center): Brett Romberg, Miami
Chuck Bednarik Award (defensive player): E. J. Henderson, Maryland
Lombardi Award (top lineman): Terrell Suggs, Arizona State
Outland Trophy (interior lineman): Rien Long, Washington State
Dick Butkus (linebacker): E. J. Henderson, Maryland
Jim Thorpe Award (defensive back): Terence Newman, Kansas State
Lou Groza Award (placekicker): Nate Kaeding, Iowa
Ray Guy Award (punter): Mark Mariscal, Colorado
The Home Depot Coach of the Year Award: Ty Willingham, Notre Dame
Paul "Bear" Bryant Award: Jim Tressel, Ohio St.

References